The  is a Japanese railway line operated by the East Japan Railway Company (JR East) in Japan. It connects Tokyo with the east coast of Chiba Prefecture, passing through the cities of Funabashi, Chiba, and Chōshi. Its name derives from the old provinces of the area which it serves: Musashi, Shimōsa and Kazusa. Its official line color is navy.

Definition

However, informally, the character of the line changes at Chiba. The more urbanized section west of Chiba is informally, but commonly, called the Sōbu Line() without using "Main". The "Main Line", in popular usage, refers to the more rural section east of Chiba.

Route maps, signs at stations, in trains, and the vocal announcements all maintain this distinction: with Main for the eastern rural section; without Main for the western frequent travel zone.

Description
Distances:
 - : 120.5 km
 - : 4.3 km
 - Etchūjima Freight (Etchūjima freight line): 11.7 km
 -  (Shinkane freight line): 8.9 km
Electrification: DC 1500 V excluding the non electrified Etchūjima freight line
Tracks
Quadruple: Kinshichō - Chiba
Double: Tokyo - Kinshichō, Kinshichō - Ochanomizu, Chiba - 
Single: Sakura - Chōshi, Shin-Koiwa - Etchūjima Freight Line, Shin-Koiwa - Kanamachi Freight Line

Operation

Services west of Chiba (Tokyo/Ochanomizu - Chiba) 
Local trains run between Ochanomizu and Chiba Station and are called the 
Chūō-Sōbu Line or Sōbu-Local Line.

Rapid trains are also operated from Tokyo Station to Chiba Station and use different tracks from the local service trains. These Rapid trains sometimes continue east on the Main Line after reaching Chiba. In reverse, Sobu Main Line trains also sometimes continue west on the Rapid Line after reaching Chiba, some even go on the Yokosuka Line after Tokyo. The rapid trains are called Sōbu Rapid Line.

For the most part, Rapid and Local trains run parallel with each other, except when they reach Kinshicho, where Sōbu Line Local trains continue onto the Chūō Line at Ochanomizu via Akihabara, while Sōbu Line Rapid trains head to Tokyo, with most of them continuing onto the Yokosuka Line.

For more details of services west of Chiba, see the relevant articles for the Local and Rapid Lines.

Services east of Chiba (Chiba - Chōshi) 
The section east of Chiba, from Chiba to Chōshi, is commonly known as the Sōbu Main Line. The aforementioned Sōbu Rapid Line through service trains would terminate at Sakura or Narutō on the Main Line, or go on the Narita Line after Sakura for Narita Airport or Kashima-Jingu. Aside from that, there are also local trains running along the entire section, from Chiba to Chōshi.

Limited express
The Narita Express to Narita Airport Station and the Ayame to 
 use the Sōbu Main Line for their journey.

Shiosai, also a Limited Express service, which operates from Tokyo Station to Chōshi, also uses this line.

Stations

Tokyo / Ochanomizu - Kinshichō - Chiba 

Here is a list of stations within this section. ([ ] denotes the Ochanomizu - Kinshicho section.)
Tokyo - Shin-Nihombashi - Bakurochō [ Ochanomizu - Akihabara - Asakusabashi - Ryōgoku - Kinshichō ] Kameido - Hirai - Shin-Koiwa - Koiwa - Ichikawa - Moto-Yawata - Shimōsa-Nakayama - Nishi-Funabashi - Funabashi - Higashi-Funabashi - Tsudanuma - Makuharihongō - Makuhari - Shin-Kemigawa - Inage - Nishi-Chiba - Chiba

Chiba - Chōshi 
For the connections of the line, see the route diagram.

From Chiba to Sakura, the section is double track; and from Sakura onwards to Choshi, the section is single track.

Legend:

 ● : All trains stop
 ▲ : Only westbound trains (for Chiba, Tokyo) stop
 ｜ : All trains pass

Rolling stock

Limited express 

 255 series (Shiosai 9-car)
 E257-500 series (Shiosai 10-car)
 E259 series (Narita Express)

Local/Rapid

Chūō-Sōbu Line

Sōbu Line (Rapid)

Sōbu Main Line 
209-2000/2100 series EMUs
E217 series EMUs
E235-1000 series EMUs (since 21 December 2020)

History

Private construction
Initially, the line was constructed by a private company, Sōbu Railway(). It opened the first service sections, between Ichikawa and Sakura on July 20, 1894, and extended to Tokyo City. 
In December of the same year, Honjo(now ) was opened, and in 1904, on the east bank of Sumida River, Ryōgokubashi(now ) became a terminal of this line. The access routes to the west, to Tokyo City, were tramways for passengers and ships for freight. From Sahara to the east, this line reached another terminus, Chōshi in 1897.

Nationalisation
The line was nationalized in 1907 under the Railway Nationalization Act, and was double-tracked from Ryōgokubashi to Chiba the next year. The predecessor of the Japanese National Railways (JNR) planned to connect with other lines inside Tokyo. In 1932, a new passenger line was opened from Ochanomizu to Ryōgoku (with new platform besides the original terminal facility), and a frequent service of EMUs commenced. Electrification to Chiba was completed in 1935, and local trains have run through from the Chūō line since then. But, except for a few trains, no rapid service was operated on this line, and the passengers had to use the local train, or its rival, Keisei Electric Railway.

Bombing of Tokyo
On March 10, 1945, the Bombing of Tokyo caused casualties estimated at 70,000–100,000, and destroyed stations of the line. During the last days of World War II in 1945, the Imperial Japanese Army thought the US Army would attempt a landing operation, "Operation Coronet", on Kujūkuri Beach, and transferred troops on the Sōbu Main Line.

Steam trains
Between Chiba and Chōshi, in the rural area of Chiba Prefecture, steam traction was used until recently. Fish and soy sauce from Chōshi were major freight items. Because Tokyo was close, JNR did not provide rapid or express trains from Ryōgoku to Chōshi until 1958. JNR operated tourist trains from Ryōgoku to the seaside resorts on the coast from the 1950s.

Five-destination operation
In the 1960s, JNR started the Five-Destination Operation() to steeply increase commuter demand, and it determined that a new rapid line would be constructed from Tokyo Station to Chiba. A new underground line from Tokyo to Kinshichō, and a four-tracked section to Tsudanuma were opened in 1972, and the operator began frequent rapid services from Tokyo to Chiba. The line was managed by the East Japan Railway Company (JR East) from 1987. The parallel Keiyō Line was opened closer to the coast in 1990. It was first constructed for freight services but later to carry passengers.

Further electrification
To the east of Chiba, electrification reached Chōshi in 1974, and Limited Express Shiosai has been operated from the underground Tokyo Station since 1975. Freight services from Chōshi ceased in 1986, just before the privatization of JNR, and regular passenger trains stopped using the Ryōgoku terminal platforms in 1988. JR East started a new airport train, the Narita Express in 1991. Rapid urbanization around Chiba Station made this section important for commuter traffic, for the city of Chiba, and for Greater Tokyo.

Former connecting lines
 Shimosa-Nakayama station (see Chuo-Sobu Line) - A 2 km  gauge human powered line, built to haul sweet potatoes and firewood, but which also carried passengers from 1911, operated to Kamagaya between 1908 and 1918.
 Yachimata station - The Narita Railway Co. opened a 14 km,  gauge line to Sanrizuka in 1917. In 1928 the line was converted to  gauge in conjunction with the extension of the Tako Line (see next entry) to Youkaichiba via Sanrizuka. The line closed in 1940.
 Youkaichiba station - The Narita Railway Co. operated the Tako line, 30 km in length, to Narita between 1928 and 1944.

References

 
Lines of East Japan Railway Company
Railway lines in Tokyo
Railway lines in Chiba Prefecture
Railway lines opened in 1894
1067 mm gauge railways in Japan